Merisairas (Finnish: Seasick) is a 1996 thriller film directed by Veikko Aaltonen and starring Bob Peck, Katrin Cartlidge and Peter Firth. An English-language film, it was a co-production between Sweden, Finland and France. The screenplay concerns eco-terrorists who attack a ship carrying toxic waste.

Cast
 Bob Peck – Captain Sebastian Belger
 Katrin Cartlidge – Elena Polakov
 John Castle – Chief Engineer Josif Mantz
 Peter Firth – 1st Officer Roald Jensen
 Matti Onnismaa – 2nd Officer Pavic
 Sheila Gish – Martina Schaffer
 Giles Thomas – 3rd Officer Lew Melik
 John Bardon – Bosun Patrick Forget
 Ilari Johansson – Radio operator Jimmy Perez
 Claire Benedict – Cook Saba
 Richard Kill – Seaman Giles
 Antti Reini – 1st Engineer Tino Silenzi
 Frank Boyle – Seaman Etkind
 Juuso Hirvikangas – Seaman Juhani Turtola
 Mikael Kerimov – Doctor Barnier
 Clarke Peters – Radio reporter Pounds
 Jonathan Hutchings – Snuff Rawlings

References

External links

1996 films
Finnish thriller films
Swedish thriller films
1990s thriller films
English-language Finnish films
English-language Swedish films
1990s Swedish films